Eucarphia vinetella is a species of snout moth in the genus Eucarphia. It was described by Johan Christian Fabricius in 1787 and is known from France, Germany, Austria, Italy, Croatia, Hungary, Romania, Ukraine and Russia.

References

Moths described in 1787
Phycitini
Moths of Europe
Moths of Asia